Peucolaus Soter Dicaeus (epithets mean respectively, "the Saviour", "the Just") was an Indo-Greek king who ruled in the area of Gandhara c. 90 BCE. His reign was probably short and insignificant, since he left only a few coins, but the relations of the latter Indo-Greek kings remain largely obscure.

His name could be interpreted as "The man from Pushkalavati". Pushkalavati was the historic capital of Gandhara located in the Valley of Peshawar.

Coinage
Peucolaus struck rare Indian standard silver coins with portrait in diadem, and a reverse of a standing Zeus, which resemble the reverse of contemporary kings Heliokles II and Archebios. The latter has overstruck two coins of Peucolaos.

He also issued bilingual bronzes with Artemis and a crowned woman with a palm branch, perhaps a city-goddess or a personification of Tyche, the deity for good luck.

See also
 Greco-Bactrian Kingdom
 Greco-Buddhism
 Indo-Scythians
 Indo-Parthian Kingdom
 Kushan Empire

References

Bibliography
 The Greeks in Bactria and India, W. W. Tarn, Cambridge University Press.
 The Coin Types of the Indo-Greek Kings, 256-54 B.C., A. K. Narain
Le Roi Peukolaos

External links
Catalog of the coins of Peucolaos

Indo-Greek kings
1st-century BC rulers in Asia